Jordan Nikolić (11 May 1933 – 26 April 2018) was a Serbian folk singer who interpreted traditional songs from Kosovo.

Biography
Nikolić was born on 11 May 1933, in Prizren, Kingdom of Yugoslavia. His parents were born in Sredačka župa, from where they moved to Prizren. His father played the gusle. In primary school and in gymnasium, he was a member of the choir.

Jordan Nikolić graduated the Yugoslav literature and Serbian language at the Faculty of Philology in Belgrade. He found his interest while studying Serbian folk music in school. His first recording was made in 1961, in the Radio Pristina, and two years later he became the music editor of the same radio station. In 1968 he began recording for programs of Radio Belgrade, spreading the rich repertoire of Kosovo folk songs.

During a 50-year career, in cooperation with Mara Đorđević, Nikolić searched and saved from oblivion ancient songs from Kosovo and southern Serbia, some predating the Battle of Kosovo in 1389. About a hundred of his voice recordings are saved in Radio Belgrade archives.

Nikolić participated in Jugovizija (Yugoslavian Eurosong qualification contest) in 1976.

He died in Belgrade on 26 April 2018, aged 84.

Awards
Estradna nagrada Jugoslavije
Estradna nagrada Srbije
Majstorsko pismo grada Niš

Discography
Singles:
1968 – Ovih dana reče meni Jana (feat. Danica Obrenić) (single)
1968 – Zašto nisam ptica (7", EP), 1968
1970 – Voli me još malo
1976 – Tvoje ruke su miran san

Albums and compilations:
1982 – Razgranala grana jorgovana, PGP RTB
1998 – Simbil cveće, PGP RTS
2007 – Zapisano u vremenu, PGP RTS (triple CD edition)
2009 – Srpske pesme sa Kosova, PGP RTS

See also
Similar repertoire
Vasilija Radojčić (1936–2011)
Staniša Stošić (1945–2008)
Teofilovići (born 1966)

References

External links

Kosovo u glasu Jordana Nikolića (article published by Radio Television of Serbia)

1933 births
2018 deaths
Serbian folk singers
20th-century Serbian male singers
People from Prizren
Kosovo Serbs
Serbian folk music
Kosovan singers
Yugoslav male singers